James Crace  (born 1 March 1946) is an English novelist, playwright and short story writer. Elected a Fellow of the Royal Society of Literature in 1999, Crace was born in Hertfordshire and has lectured at the University of Texas at Austin. His novels have been translated into 28 languages—including Norwegian, Japanese, Portuguese and Hebrew.

Crace's first novel, Continent, was published in 1990. Signals of Distress won the 1994 Winifred Holtby Memorial Prize. His next novel, Quarantine, won the Whitbread Novel in 1997 and was shortlisted for the Booker Prize of the same year. Being Dead won the National Book Critics Circle Award in 1999. Harvest was shortlisted for the 2013 Booker Prize, won the 2013 James Tait Black Memorial Prize and won the 2015 International Dublin Literary Award.

Crace received the American Academy of Arts and Letters  E. M. Forster Award in 1996. He was awarded a Windham–Campbell Literature Prize in 2015.

Early life
Crace was born in 1946 at the neo-classical Hertfordshire country house of Brocket Hall, while it served as a maternity hospital. His father he described in 2013 as "a great walker and birder, a curmudgeonly leftwing atheist who... was open-hearted in the big things and narrow and doctrinaire in every other respect... I loved my father to bits and as his life was walking, lawn care, politics, books and tennis I have totally turned into him, because those are now the five notes of my life as well". An edition of Roget's Thesaurus that his father gave him as a Christmas present when he was 11 Crace retained as a "consant companion, my best possession", throughout his life.

Crace grew up at Enfield, London and attended Enfield Grammar School. There he was involved in the Campaign for Nuclear Disarmament and Keep Left but did not attend to his A-Levels. He ended up at the Birmingham College of Commerce. He joined Voluntary Service Overseas (VSO), and was based in Sudan. A year later he returned to the UK, where he worked for a time at the BBC.

Between 1976 and 1987, Crace worked as a freelance journalist, including for The Sunday Times and the Radio Times, before quitting due an experience at The Sunday Times, where his report on the Broadwater Farm riot did not receive the acclaim of his editor, owing to his unwillingness to describe in sufficient detail the hell-like features of this estate.

Personal life
Having spent many years living in the Moseley area of Birmingham with his wife Pamela Turton, Crace announced when they were 67 years of age that they would be moving to rural Worcestershire, "you're supposed to want to downsize, but we actually want to upsize", he commented. He described Birmingham as somewhere "we've always hung in there because we thought it politically important to be in a place where the future is being mapped out, rather than the past being replayed, which is what happens if you go to a Cotswolds village".

Crace and Turton have two children, Thomas Charles Crace (born 1981) and the actress Lauren Rose Crace (born 1986), who played Danielle Jones in EastEnders. Crace went on to become a grandfather.

A scientific atheist and modern Darwinist, he is a former member of the British Labour Party, but left in a dispute over its stance on the Iraq and Afghanistan wars.

Influences
Crace has expressed his admiration for Günter Grass, Italo Calvino and Primo Levi, adding "Less so Kundera, more so the Latin American magical realists".

Writing
In 1974 Crace published his first work of prose fiction, "Annie, California Plates" in The New Review, and in the next 10 years would write a number of short stories and radio plays, including: Helter Skelter, Hang Sorrow, Care'll Kill a Cat, The New Review (December 1975), reprinted in Cosmopolitan and included in Introduction 6: Stories by new writers, Faber and Faber (1977); Refugees, winner of the Socialist Challenge short story competition (judges: John Fowles, Fay Weldon, Terry Eagleton), Socialist Challenge (1977); Seven Ages; Quarto (June 1980), broadcast as Middling by BBC Radio 3. The Bird Has Flown, a radio play, was broadcast on BBC Radio 4 on 28 October 1976. A Coat of Many Colours, a radio play, was broadcast on BBC Radio 4 on 24 March 1979.

Crace has been a socialist throughout his life, though this is not evident from his published fiction. He stated: "I know my 17-year-old self would read my bourgeois fiction, full of metaphors and rhythmic prose, with a sinking heart". He also admits to forgetting details from his own books.

Receiving a request to review a book by the Colombian writer Gabriel García Márquez and, not admiring it because he believed he could do just as well or fancying himself capable of doing even better, Crace set out to write what would become his first novel. That novel, titled Continent, was published in 1986. It consists of seven stories, united by their setting and themes.   Crace was aged 40 when Continent was published.

Crace's second book, The Gift of Stones, is set at the beginning of the Bronze Age. He based an amputation scene in that book on his father's experience with osteomyelitis—"his left arm was withered between his elbow and his shoulder. It was pitted with holes, and weeping with pus for most of my childhood," Crace stated. His third book, titled Arcadia, was published in 1992. It features a character called Victor, owner of a fruit and vegetable market in an unnamed city that resembles Covent Garden in London, and who has just reached his eightieth birthday.

Signals of Distress was published in 1994. Set in the nineteenth-century, it features an African slave stranded on the outskirts of an English village and Aymer Smith, who will set it free. Quarantine was published in 1997. It depicts Jesus in the Judean desert. Despite intending to rewrite what he claimed was a harmful and dishonest narrative, Crace ended up writing what he called a "a very scriptural book" and when approached by its readers he discovers they "believe in God and have found that the book has underscored their beliefs rather than undermining it".

Being Dead, published in 1999, opens with a couple who are murdered while on a visit to some sand dunes. The Devil's Larder was published in 2001. Its preface contains a quote from the Book of Visitations, a work of Biblical apocrypha which does not exist. It is a collection of 64 stories, often on the theme of food, offering such insights as the taste of a cremated cat's remains, a restaurant in a coastal town in which nothing is served but the customer is charged anyway, two people trying to taste food in each other's mouth to detect any possible difference there might be. Six, which Crace admits is one of his least successful books, was published in 2003, flawed by his inability to concentrate wholly on it as his mother slowly died from dementia and cancer and the effort extracted by his being her primary carer. Other books would follow, among them The Pest House, which concerns America's medieval future.

He planned to write a book called Archipelago and spoke of it in advance. Archipelago, inspired by the loss of his parents, ultimately went unfinished, abandoned after 40,000 words. The very next day, following abandonment and whilst at the Watford Gap, he found inspiration to write what would become Harvest. It was published on 14 February 2013. Set over seven days in a rural area in an undetermined century, it features narrator Walter Thirsk. When it won the €100,000 International Dublin Literary Award, Crace said it was "vindication" for his publisher Picador: "I don't consider readers when I write, I write my own books and don't give a damn about what people think of them. And [Picador have] stood by me, they’ve said 'do what you want, we're your publisher for a career'".

Having "retired" from writing novels after Harvest, Crace reemerged in 2018 with The Melody. An elderly widower, curious as to what is rattling his bins at night, ventures out to investigate and is leapt upon and bitten by a creature he senses is different from the dogs or deer to which he is accustomed. On this occasion it is, he is sure, a boy. eden was published in 2022. It is set in the eponymous Garden, following the expulsion of Adam and Eve.

On his writing experience Crace has stated: "With writing there is a moment of abandonment for me... particularly if you're not an autobiographical writer, and you're wanting this intuitive thing to bubble up, and to lead the story to places you don't expect it to go, then you have to wait for the moment of abandonment, because if you don't, these things aren't going to happen. I love that moment of abandonment, when a story starts to take over and take its own direction".

He set himself against Hilary Mantel's points on the writing of historical novels. Crace said: "Number one was that if you include a fact then you should make sure it is true. I'm not interested in that at all. I don't want facts, I want to make things up and to dig deep into traditional storytelling to produce a tale that illustrates the subject matter I care about". On Mantel's opposition to modern ideas being transposed onto a historical landscape, Crace responded: "No feminists in 1420. But I'm not interested in anything else but foisting those sensibilities and writing books that concern the 21st-century".

In 2001, he stated: "I adore falseness. I don't want you to tell me accurately what happened yesterday. I want you to lie about it, to exaggerate, to entertain me."

In response to the assertion by critic Adam Mars-Jones that to read a passage from a Crace book is to invite a migraine, he described it as "very funny... I recognise that that can be true... there are many things about my books that you can list and they will infuriate you. But that's my voice".

The University of Texas has purchased Crace's archive.

Lecturing
As of 2013, Crace was visiting professor at the University of Texas at Austin.

Awards and honours
He was elected a Fellow of the Royal Society of Literature in 1999.

Works

Novels

Short stories
  (short stories)
  (64 short pieces) Extract in The Paris Review

See also

 Relationship between religion and science

References

Further reading
 Peck, Dale. "The Devil You Know." Review of The Devil's Larder by Jim Crace. Hatchet Jobs. New York: The New Press, 2004. 133–49.
 Tew, Philip. Jim Crace. Manchester: Manchester University Press, 2006.

External links

Jim-Crace.com – Original source for biography. Permission granted by Andrew Hewitt, webmaster

Jim Crace's Writer's Reflect at the Harry Ransom Center
TehelkaTV interview with Jim Crace — The unimportance of literature, and Jim's experience of journalism, January 2011 at YouTube

1946 births
Living people
Alumni of Birmingham City University
Alumni of the University of London
Alumni of University of London Worldwide
English atheists
English historical novelists
English male dramatists and playwrights
English male novelists
English male short story writers
Fellows of the Royal Society of Literature
Iowa Writers' Workshop faculty
People educated at Enfield Grammar School
The Sunday Times people
20th-century atheists
20th-century British short story writers
20th-century English dramatists and playwrights
20th-century English male writers
20th-century English novelists
21st-century atheists
21st-century British short story writers
21st-century English male writers
21st-century English novelists
University of Texas at Austin faculty
Writers from Birmingham, West Midlands
Writers of fiction set in prehistoric times